This is a list of mercenaries. It includes foreign volunteers, private military contractors, and other "soldiers of fortune".

Antiquity

Medieval

Early modern

Industrial

Modern

References
 Brooks, M. Evan. Military History's Most Wanted: The Top 10 Book of Improbable Victories, Unlikely Heroes, and Other Martial Oddities. Potomac Books, 2002.
 Davis, Richard Harding. Six Who Dared: The Lives of Six Great Soldiers of Fortune. Fireship Press, 2007.
 Lanning, Michael Lee. Mercenaries: Soldiers of Fortune, from Ancient Greece to Today's Private Military Companies. Random House Publishing Group, 2007.
 Mockler, Anthony. The Mercenaries: The Men Who Fight for Profitfrom the Free Companies of Feudal France to the White Adventurers in the Congo. Macmillan, 1969.

Further reading
Ancient World
 Griffith, G. T. The Mercenaries of the Hellenistic World. Cambridge University Press, 1935.
 Trundle, Matthew. Greek Mercenaries: From the Late Archaic Period to Alexander. Routledge, 2004.
 Yalichev, Serge. Mercenaries of the Ancient World. Constable, 1997.

Medieval
 France, John, ed. "Mercenaries and Paid Men: The Mercenary Identity in the Middle Ages". Smithsonian History of Warfare. Vol. 47. Brill, 2008. 
 Janin, Hunt and Ursula Carlson. Mercenaries in Medieval and Renaissance Europe. McFarland, 2013.
 Mallett, Michael. Mercenaries and their Masters: Warfare in Renaissance Italy. Pen and Sword, 2009.
 Murphy, David. Condottiere 1300–1500: Infamous Medieval Mercenaries. Oxford: Osprey, 2007.

Early modern
 Dempsey, Guy. Napoleon's Mercenaries: Foreign Units in the French Army Under the Consulate and Empire, 1799–1814. Frontline Books, 2002.
 Ingrao, Charles W. The Hessian Mercenary State: Ideas, Institutions, and Reform Under Frederick II, 1760–1785. Cambridge University Press, 2003.
 Janice E. Thomson, Mercenaries, pirates, and sovereigns: state-building and extraterritorial violence in early modern Europe Princeton University Press, 1994.  Describes the building of the modern state system through the states' "monopolization of extraterritorial violence."
 Rodriguez, Moises Enrique. Freedom's Mercenaries: British Volunteers in the Wars of Independence of Latin America. Vol. 2. Hamilton Books, 2006.
 Military science in western Europe in the sixteenth century. Prologue:The nature of armies in the 16th century (pdf): A given army often included numerous nationalities and languages. The normal Landsknecht regiment included one interpreter per 400 men, and interpreters were commonly budgeted for in the staffs of the field armies of the French, and of German reiter regiments as well. Fluency in multiple languages was a valuable skill for a captain, given that it was not uncommon for armies to consist of a majority of foreign nationals.

Industrial
 Edwards, John Carver. Airmen Without Portfolio: U.S. Mercenaries in Civil War Spain. Praeger, 1997.
 Jowett, Philip. Chinese Warlord Armies 1911–30. Bloomsbury Publishing, 2012.
 Langley, Lester D. and Thomas D. Schoonover. The Banana Men: American Mercenaries and Entrepreneurs in Central America, 1880–1930. University Press of Kentucky, 2014.
 Roche, James Jeffrey. The Story of the Filibusters. T. F. Unwin, 1891.

Modern
 Mockler, Anthony. The New Mercenaries: The History of the Mercenary from the Congo to the Seychelles. Paragon House, 1987.
 Arnold, Guy. Mercenaries: The Scourge of the Third World. Palgrave Macmillan, 1999. 
 Pelton, Robert Young. Licensed to Kill: Hired Guns in the War on Terror. Crown, 2006. 
 Mockler, Anthony. Hired Guns and Coups d'Etat: Mercenaries: Thirty Years 1976–2006. Hunter Mackay, 2007.
 Jeremy Scahill. Blackwater: The Rise of the World's Most Powerful Mercenary Army, Nation Books, 2007. 
 P. W. Singer. Corporate Warriors: The Rise of the Privatized Military Industry, Cornell University Press, 2007 
 Woolley, Peter J. "Soldiers of Fortune," The Common Review, v. 5, no. 4(2007), pp. 46–48. Review essay.
 Venter, Al J. War Dog: Fighting Other People's Wars: The Modern Mercenary in Combat. Lancer Publishers, 2010.
 Othen, Christopher. Katanga 1960–63: Mercenaries, Spies and the African Nation that Waged War on the World. History Press, 2015.
 McFate, Sean. The Modern Mercenary: Private Armies and What They Mean for World Order. Oxford University Press, 2016.
 Chase, Simon & Pezzullo, Ralph. Zero Footprint. Mulholland Books, 2017 
Lists of military personnel
Mercenaries